Nikolskoye 1-ye is a rural locality (a selo) and the administrative center of Nikolskoye 1-ye Rural Settlement, Vorobyovsky District, Voronezh Oblast, Russia. The population was 1,197 as of 2010. There are 14 streets.

Geography 
Nikolskoye 1-ye is located 19 km southeast of Vorobyovka (the district's administrative centre) by road. Nikolskoye 2-ye is the nearest rural locality.

References 

Rural localities in Vorobyovsky District